Dugarsurengiin Oyunbold (b. October  05, 1958 – d. 2002 ) was a Mongolian wrestler. At the 1980 Summer Olympics he won the bronze medal in the men's Freestyle Bantamweight category.

References

External links
 
profile

1957 births
2002 deaths
People from Sükhbaatar Province
Olympic wrestlers of Mongolia
Wrestlers at the 1980 Summer Olympics
Mongolian male sport wrestlers
Olympic bronze medalists for Mongolia
Olympic medalists in wrestling
Medalists at the 1980 Summer Olympics
World Wrestling Championships medalists
Universiade medalists in wrestling
Universiade bronze medalists for Mongolia
20th-century Mongolian people
21st-century Mongolian people